"Your Body Is a Wonderland" is a song written and performed by American singer-songwriter John Mayer. It was released on June 3, 2002, as the second single from his debut studio album, Room for Squares (2001). It reached number 18 on the US Billboard Hot 100 and number nine on the New Zealand Singles Chart.

Background
During his "VH1 Storytellers" performance, Mayer stated that he wrote the song about his first girlfriend at age 14. The song was actually named "Strawberry Wonderland" but was later changed by Mayer.

There has been speculation that Mayer wrote the song about Jennifer Love Hewitt, whom he dated in 2002, but she denied it. Hewitt told Entertainment Weekly, "My body is far from a wonderland. My body is more like a pawnshop. There's a lot of interesting things put together, and if you look closely you'd probably be excited, but at first glance, not so much".

According to the liner notes, a toy piano is used as an instrument in the song.

Lyrical content
The line "I'm never speaking up again", sung in the background, is also prominently featured in the chorus to the song "My Stupid Mouth", which appears just before the song on Room for Squares.

Critical reception
Billboard said the song showcases Mayer's "smooth, casual singing style and barroom instrumentation." In 2003, "Your Body Is a Wonderland" won Mayer the Grammy Award for Best Male Pop Vocal Performance. The song ranked at No. 28 on Blender magazine's list of the "50 Worst Songs Ever".

Music video
The video starred the actress Holly Lynch. The video was directed by Jim Gable, and edited by Scott C. Wilson.

Track listing
All songs are written by John Mayer except where noted otherwise.
 "Your Body Is a Wonderland" – 4:09
 "No Such Thing" (Acoustic version, live from WXPN) (John Mayer & Clay Cook) – 3:46
 "Your Body Is a Wonderland" (acoustic version, live from WXPN) – 5:46
 "Not Myself" (demo version) – 4:05

Personnel
 John Mayer – vocals, guitar, toy piano, vibraphone, Korg Triton synthesizer
 David LaBruyere – bass
 Nir Z – drums
 Brandon Bush – Wurlitzer electric piano
 John Alagia – percussion, Hammond organ
 Chris Fischer – congas

Charts

Weekly charts

Year-end charts

Certifications

Release history

Appearances in the media
In 2006, the song was used in an episode of U.S. version of The Office, entitled "A Benihana Christmas". Characters Michael Scott and Andy Bernard sing the song as a karaoke duet. Mayer agreed to let the show use the song, in exchange for a Dundie, which was for "Tallest Music Dude".

References

External links
 "Your Body Is A Wonderland" music video on YouTube

2001 songs
2002 singles
Columbia Records singles
Grammy Award for Best Male Pop Vocal Performance
John Mayer songs
Songs written by John Mayer